Lita Grey (born Lillita Louise MacMurray, April 15, 1908 – December 29, 1995), who was known for most of her life as Lita Grey Chaplin, was an American actress. She was the second wife of Charlie Chaplin, and appeared in his films The Kid, The Idle Class, and The Gold Rush.

Background
She was born in Hollywood, California, to Lillian Carrillo Curry Grey and Robert Earl McMurray, and christened Lillita Louise MacMurray. Her father was of Scottish descent, and her mother's family was descended from an illustrious ninth-generation Californian Hispanos family, whose luminaries included Antonio Maria Lugo. The Lugos were from Andalusia, Spain, and were one of the first families to bring horses to the country. In a 1993 interview, Grey claimed to be a great-grandniece of former California governor Henry Gage.

Life and career

Grey married four times. By her own account she first met Charlie Chaplin at the age of eight at a Hollywood café, and first worked with him at the age of 12 in the part of the "flirting angel" in The Kid. She also appeared briefly as a maid in The Idle Class. Her one-year contract was not renewed. At the age of 15, she met Chaplin again when she heard he was testing brunettes for his next film The Gold Rush. She was initially cast as the leading lady in the film, and began an affair with the then-35-year-old Chaplin. 

Grey soon became pregnant, and since Chaplin could have been imprisoned for having sexual relations with a minor, they married that November in secret in Empalme, Sonora, Mexico, to avoid a scandal. She alleged in her divorce complaint that he "sought to have her undergo an illegal operation to prevent the birth of their first child".

They had two sons, Charles Chaplin Jr. and Sydney Chaplin, born within ten months of each other in May 1925 and March 1926, respectively.

The marriage was troubled from the start. The two had few interests in common, and Chaplin spent as much time as he could away from home, working on The Gold Rush, and later, The Circus. They divorced on August 22, 1927, due to his alleged numerous affairs with other women, and he was ordered to pay over US$600,000 ($ million in  dollars) and US$100,000 ($ million in  dollars) in trust for each child, the largest divorce settlement at the time. Copies of her lengthy divorce complaint, which made scandalous sexual claims against Chaplin, were published, and publicly sold, and the divorce became a sensational media event.

She later married Henry Aguirre and Arthur Day. The 1940 United States Census states that Lita and Arthur lived at 38 East 50th Street in New York City, and that in 1935 she had lived in England. The census listed her occupation as "singer", and Arthur's as "manager personal". Lita and Arthur adopted a baby boy in 1940, whom they named Robert. When they split up in 1946, Bobby went to live with his paternal grandmother, and Lita had little contact with him after that. She married her fourth husband, Patsy Pizzolongo (aka Pat Longo), on September 22, 1956, in Los Angeles, California. They were divorced in June 1966.

In the 1970s and 1980s, she worked as a clerk at Robinson's Department Store in Beverly Hills. She wrote two autobiographical volumes covering her life with Chaplin. My Life with Chaplin (1966) was, by her own admission, largely a work of exaggeration and fabrication. She claimed to tell the story as it really was in her second memoir Wife of the Life of the Party (1998). She is portrayed by Deborah Moore in the 1992 film Chaplin, but Grey was depicted on screen for less than a minute in the final film.

Death
She died of cancer on December 29, 1995, in Los Angeles, aged 87, and was buried in Valhalla Memorial Park Cemetery in North Hollywood, California.

Filmography

Written works

References

External links

 
  (15:00)
 Lita Grey at Virtual History

1908 births
1995 deaths
American film actresses
American people of Spanish descent
American people of Scottish descent
Deaths from cancer in California
Actresses from Hollywood, Los Angeles
20th-century American actresses
Chaplin family
Burials at Valhalla Memorial Park Cemetery